Jonathan Augustus (born 17 April 1985) is a Trinidadian cricketer. He played in three first-class and four List A matches for Trinidad and Tobago from 2003 to 2014.

See also
 List of Trinidadian representative cricketers

References

External links
 

1985 births
Living people
Trinidad and Tobago cricketers